Genevieve Marie Grotjan Feinstein (April 30, 1913 – August 10, 2006) was an American mathematician and cryptanalyst. She worked for the Signals Intelligence Service throughout World War II, during which time she played an important role in deciphering the Japanese cryptography machine Purple, and later worked on the Cold War-era Venona project.

Career 
Feinstein discovered a passion for mathematics at a young age and aspired to become a math teacher.  She graduated from the University at Buffalo summa cum laude in February 1936 with a mathematics degree. Unable to find a teaching job, she took a position as a statistical clerk at the Railroad Retirement Board. Her high score on a civil service mathematics test in 1939 got the attention of William F. Friedman, who hired her to work as a junior cryptanalyst for the Army's Signals Intelligence Service (SIS). For eighteen months, she worked with other SIS codebreakers to analyze the encryption system used in the Japanese Type B Cipher Machine, code named Purple by the SIS She played a key role in cracking the cipher, discovering cyclical behavior in the code on September 20, 1940.
This enabled the construction of an equivalent machine by the SIS which in turn enabled the interception of almost all messages exchanged between the Japanese government and its embassies in foreign countries. Purple-encoded reports from Hiroshi Oshima, the Japanese ambassador in Berlin, were a main source of intelligence about Axis plans.

In 1946, she was awarded the Exceptional Civilian Service Award from Brig. Gen. Paul Everton Peabody for her wartime service.

She was later assigned to the Venona project, trying to decode encrypted messages sent by the Soviet KGB and Main Intelligence Directorate (GRU). She made a significant breakthrough in November 1944, which allowed American cryptographers to recognize when an individual one time pad cipher was (improperly) reused. After the conclusion of World War II, Feinstein continued to work at the SIS, as the Cold War began, but resigned in 1947. After resigning from government cryptanalysis, she joined the faculty of George Mason University, where she briefly served as a professor of mathematics.

Personal life 
In 1943, Genevieve Grotjan married the Manhattan Project chemist Hyman Feinstein, who worked at the National Bureau of Standards.  They had a son named Ellis, who died of a heart condition at age 22.  Grotjan died in 2006.

Legacy 
Her husband established the annual Genevieve Feinstein Award in Cryptography at George Mason University in her honor.  Her breakthrough in deciphering the Purple machine has been called, in the Encyclopedia of American Women at War, "one of the greatest achievements in the history of U.S. codebreaking".  NSA posthumously inducted her into the NSA Hall of Honor in 2010.

In 2018, the University at Buffalo's alumni magazine featured her as "An American Hero".

References 

1913 births
2006 deaths
20th-century American mathematicians
Signals Intelligence Service cryptographers
American women civilians in World War II
George Mason University faculty
American women mathematicians
20th-century American women scientists
Scientists from Buffalo, New York
20th-century women mathematicians
Mathematicians from New York (state)
University at Buffalo alumni
Women cryptographers
21st-century American women